New Galicia or West Galicia ( or Galicja Zachodnia,  or Westgalizien) was an administrative region of the Habsburg monarchy, constituted from the territory annexed in the course of the Third Partition of Poland in 1795.

History
After the failed Kościuszko Uprising of 1794, Emperor Francis II of Habsburg agreed with Empress Catherine II of Russia to again divide and thereby completely abolish the remaining Polish–Lithuanian Commonwealth, a decision which Prussia joined on 24 October 1795. The Habsburg Monarchy, which had not participated in the Second Partition, now received a share that comprised the lands north of the Kingdom of Galicia and Lodomeria gained in the First Partition of 1772. The Habsburg Monarchy then occupied the entirety of Lesser Poland, stretching along the upper Vistula river to the outskirts of Praga and Warsaw, the tributaries of the Bug and the Pilica forming the northern border with New East Prussia.

In 1803, it was merged with the Kingdom of Galicia and Lodomeria, but retained some autonomy. It remained a territory of the Austrian Empire even when, in 1807, Napoleon I of France created the Duchy of Warsaw from territories in Greater Poland which Prussia had annexed in the Second and Third Partition and now was forced to renounce according to the Treaty of Tilsit. Austria lost New Galicia in the 1809 War of the Fifth Coalition, after a corps under Archduke Ferdinand Karl Joseph of Austria-Este on 15 April 1809 started the Polish–Austrian War by invading the Duchy of Warsaw. Despite the archduke's plans to move in as a national liberator, he was challenged by the forces of Prince Józef Poniatowski at the Battle of Raszyn. Austria was finally defeated at the Battle of Wagram on 6 July, whereafter New Galicia was attached to the Duchy of Warsaw by the Treaty of Schönbrunn.

With the Final Act of the Vienna Congress in 1815, the territory became part of Congress Poland, ruled in personal union by Emperor Alexander I of Russia, while Kraków nominally retained its independence as the Free City of Kraków.

Administration
From 1797, the seat of the local government (Gubernium) was located at Kraków. The province was divided into twelve districts:

Civil code

A civil code was introduced in West Galicia, prior to the introduction of the Austrian Civil Code in 1811. It contained little in the way of solving feudal-class problems and was based on the laws of nature.

See also
East Galicia
Galicia (Eastern Europe)
General Government

Geographic history of Poland
History of Lesser Poland
Kingdom of Galicia and Lodomeria